The 1985–86 John Player Special Cup was the 15th edition of England's premier rugby union club competition at the time. Bath won the competition for the third consecutive year defeating Wasps in the final. The event was sponsored by John Player cigarettes and the final was held at Twickenham Stadium.

Draw and results

First round

Cheshunt progress on more tries*

Second round

Third round

Northampton progress as away team*

Fourth round

Quarter-finals

Wasps progress on more tries*

Semi-finals

Final

References

1985–86 rugby union tournaments for clubs
1985–86 in English rugby union
RFU Knockout Cup